Liberty is a small borough in Tioga County, Pennsylvania,  United States. The population was 232 at the time of the 2020 census.

Geography
Liberty is located at  (41.558446, -77.103839).

According to the United States Census Bureau, the borough has a total area of 0.5 square mile (1.3 km2), all of it land.

Demographics

As of the census of 2010, there were 249 people, 93 households, and 85 families residing in the borough.

The population density was 446.5 people per square mile (170.8/km2). There were ninety-five housing units at an average density of 184.4/sq mi (70.5/km2).

The racial makeup of the borough was 99.13% White, and 0.87% from two or more races. Hispanic or Latino of any race were 0.87% of the population.

There were eighty-eight households, out of which 42.0% had children under the age of eighteen living with them; 56.8% were married couples living together, 10.2% had a female householder with no husband present, and 30.7% were non-families. 27.3% of all households were made up of individuals, and 9.1% had someone living alone who was sixty-five years of age or older.

The average household size was 2.61 and the average family size was 3.13.

In the borough the population was spread out, with 31.3% under the age of eighteen, 9.6% from eighteen to twenty-four, 28.7% from twenty-five to forty-four 18.7% from forty-five to sixty-four, and 11.7% who were sixty-five years of age or older. The median age was thirty-two years.

For every one hundre females there were 101.8 males. For every one hundred females who were aged eighteen and over, there were 97.5 males.

The median income for a household in the borough was $39,219, and the median income for a family was $38,542. Males had a median income of $27,813 compared with that of $19,688 for females.

The per capita income for the borough was $17,690.

Roughly 4.9% of families and 9.8% of the population were living below the poverty line, including 13.6% of those who were under the age of eighteen. None who were aged sixty-five or older were living in poverty.

Notable people
 Jimmy Sebring, first baseball player to hit a World Series home run, was born in Liberty.

References

External links
 Liberty, Pennsylvania

Populated places established in 1792
Boroughs in Tioga County, Pennsylvania
1893 establishments in Pennsylvania